Tippin' on Through is a live album by saxophonist Curtis Amy recorded in 1962 for the Pacific Jazz label.

Reception

AllMusic rated the album with 3 stars.

Track listing
All compositions by Curtis Amy except as indicated
 "Tippin' on Through" (Benny Golson) - 8:43	
 "Funk in the Evening" - 9:38 	
 "For Ayres Only" - 6:51 	
 "In Your Own Sweet Way" (Dave Brubeck) - 6:34
 "Summertime" (George Gershwin, DuBose Heyward) - 6:56
 "Set Call" - 0:25

Personnel 
Curtis Amy - tenor saxophone
Roy Brewster - valve trombone 
Roy Ayers - vibraphone
John Houston - piano
Bob Whitlock - bass
Lawrence Marable - drums

References 

1962 live albums
Pacific Jazz Records live albums
Curtis Amy albums
Albums recorded at the Lighthouse Café